Mário Efraín Gómez Espejero (born March 6, 1986) is a Colombian footballer who plays for Charlotte Eagles in USL Pro.

References

1986 births
Living people
Colombian footballers
Categoría Primera A players
Independiente Santa Fe footballers
Deportivo Pasto footballers
Charlotte Eagles players
Association football midfielders
Colombian expatriate footballers
Expatriate soccer players in the United States
USL Championship players
Footballers from Bogotá